The Virginia Beach mayoral election of 2020 took place on November 3, 2020. Voters elected the next Mayor of Virginia Beach, which has a council-manager system of government. The mayor presides over city council meetings and serves as the ceremonial head and spokesperson of the city. The mayor is elected to a four-year term through direct election and the office has no term limits. The mayoral election occurred simultaneously with the election of four seats on the city council. These elections were nonpartisan, as are all municipal elections in Virginia Beach.

The election saw incumbent mayor Bobby Dyer face challengers Jody Wagner, the former Virginia Secretary of Finance and Virginia State Treasurer, and Richard "RK" Kowalewitch, a local businessman. Dyer defeated Wagner and was reelected to a second term by a margin of 51.64% to her 43.83%.

Background
On February 27, 2020, city council member Aaron Rouse announced his intention to seek the office. When reached by The Virginian-Pilot for comment on the announcement, Bobby Dyer confirmed that he would be seeking re-election. On May 30, 2020, Rouse announced that he was dropping out of the race citing the coronavirus pandemic as the reason for ending his campaign. On June 9, 2020, former Virginia Secretary of Finance Jody Wagner announced that she would challenge Dyer in the upcoming election. On June 12, 2020, businessman Richard W. "RK" Kowalewitch announced that he would also challenge Dyer.

On October 8, 2020, the Virginia Beach Forum conducted a series of interviews with Dyer, Wagner, and Kowalewitch.

On November 4, 2020, results confirmed that Dyer had won the election and been reelected to a second term. That morning, Wagner conceded to Dyer saying in a statement that they "both agreed that what our city needs right now is unity, and I look forward to working with him to move our city forward and address the critical challenges we face. While I am disappointed in the outcome of the election, I am incredibly grateful for the support from friends, family, and our entire community."

Candidates

Withdrew before the election

Endorsements

Results

References 

2020 Virginia elections
2020 United States mayoral elections
2020